Alice Theadom is an English-born New Zealand psychologist and academic. As of 2020 she is a full professor and Rutherford Discovery Fellow at Auckland University of Technology (AUT).

Academic career 

Theadom completed a BSc (psychology) at the University of Essex, followed by an MSc in Health Psychology at the University of Surrey. She moved to New Zealand to take up a position as associate professor at Auckland University of Technology from May 2009 and completed a PhD at the same university in 2011. 

Theadom won AUT's emerging researcher award for academic excellence in research in 2013. In 2018 she was awarded a Rutherford Discovery Fellowship by the Royal Society Te Apārangi.

In late 2019 she was appointed full professor at AUT.

Selected works

References

External links 

 
 
 

Living people
Year of birth missing (living people)
New Zealand psychologists
New Zealand women psychologists
New Zealand women academics
Auckland University of Technology alumni
Academic staff of the Auckland University of Technology
Alumni of the University of Essex
Alumni of the University of Surrey
English emigrants to New Zealand